The X-Bolt Rifle is a bolt-action rifle designed by the American Browning Arms Company. It is manufactured by Miroku Corp. in Japan.

Description 
The X-BOLT rifle is a bolt-action rifle. Its name comes from the "X-Lock" scope mounting system. In addition, it uses the "X-BOLT Feather Trigger" which features an adjustable trigger pull.

Variations 

The X-Bolt rifle has many variations, yet most are small differences such as different barrel lengths and caliber.

 RMEF Special Hunter
 RMEF White Gold
 Composite 3D Birds Eye Maple Blued / Stainless
 Composite Stalker
 Eclipse Hunter
 Stalker Typhon Suppressor Ready
 High Grade Hunter Full Line Dealer
 Hunter
 Hunter Full Line Dealer
 Hunter, Left-Hand
 Long Range Hunter Carbon Fiber
 Long Range Hunter Realtree Max-1
 Medallion
 Medallion Maple
 Medallion, Left-Hand
 Micro Buckthom Pink
 Micro Hunter
 Micro Hunter, Left-Hand
 Micro Midas
 Mossy Oak Brush
 SSA Predator Hunter Mossy Oak Brush
 SSA Predator Hunter Realtree Max-1
 Stainless Stalker
 Stainless Stalker Carbon Fiber Fluted
 Stainless Stalker, Open Sights
 Varmint Stalker
 White Gold

See also
 List of firearms
 List of rifle cartridges

References

External links 
 The official Browning Arms Company website
 X-Bolt rifle page from the Official Browning arms website

Bolt-action rifles